Kau Mapu (died 20 November 1979) was a Cook Islands chief, civil servant and politician. He was a member of the Legislative Assembly between 1958 and 1965.

Biography
Mapu was descended from several Ariki families and held the title Tearikivao Putokotoko Pareraka Mataiapo. He was a civil servant, working in the Public Works department. In 1958 he was elected to the new Legislative Assembly as a representative of Aitutaki Island Council. He was re-elected in 1961, but the Island Council seats were abolished at the 1965 elections.

He died at his home in Aitutaki in November 1979 at the age of 72.

References

Cook Island civil servants
Members of the Parliament of the Cook Islands
1979 deaths